Heis is a small lunar impact crater that is located in the western part of the Mare Imbrium. It was named after German astronomer Eduard Heis. It is located to the northeast of the crater Delisle, and south of C. Herschel.  Due east is the wrinkle ridge Dorsum Heim. Heis is a circular, symmetrical formation with an interior floor that is about half the diameter of the outer rim. The tiny satellite crater Heis A intrudes slightly into the northern rim.

Satellite craters
By convention these features are identified on lunar maps by placing the letter on the side of the crater midpoint that is closest to Heis.

References

 
 
 
 
 
 
 
 
 
 
 

Impact craters on the Moon
Mare Imbrium